Dolenji Radenci is a small settlement on the left bank of the Kolpa River in the Municipality of Črnomelj in the White Carniola area of southeastern Slovenia. The area is part of the traditional region of Lower Carniola and is now included in the Southeast Slovenia Statistical Region.

There is a small chapel-shrine in the settlement dedicated to the Virgin Mary. It bears the date 1868.

References

External links
Dolenji Radenci on Geopedia

Populated places in the Municipality of Črnomelj